Welle N'Diaye (born 5 April 1990) is a Senegalese footballer who plays as a midfielder for Niarry Tally.

Career
N'Diaye signed his first professional contract in September 2010 with Slovenian club Gorica. He was capped once in the 2010–11 Slovenian PrvaLiga. In January 2011 he was loaned to Brda. He later returned to play for Gorica. He moved to Maribor on 30 June 2014. He left the club in June 2016 after his contract expired.

Honours
Maribor
Slovenian PrvaLiga: 2014–15
Slovenian Supercup: 2014
Slovenian Cup: 2015–16

References

External links
PrvaLiga profile 

1990 births
Living people
Footballers from Dakar
Senegalese footballers
Association football midfielders
Association football forwards
Senegalese expatriate footballers
Senegalese expatriate sportspeople in Italy
Expatriate footballers in Italy
Senegalese expatriate sportspeople in Slovenia
Expatriate footballers in Slovenia
ND Gorica players
NK Brda players
NK Maribor players
Slovenian PrvaLiga players